Zerbe Run (also known as Zerbe Creek) is a tributary of Mahanoy Creek in Northumberland County, Pennsylvania, in the United States. Part of the stream is impaired by abandoned mine drainage, but its upper reaches are not impacted by mining. Several mine drainage discharges occur within the watershed. The stream is not far from the Western Middle Anthracite Field.

Zerbe Run is one of the major tributaries of Mahanoy Creek. Its watershed makes up 8.1 percent of the Mahanoy Creek drainage basin. A number of bridges have been constructed over the stream. Its watershed is designated as a Coldwater Fishery and a Migratory Fishery, but there are no fish in the stream. However, the Zerbe Run Rod And Gun Club Pond is stocked with trout and numerous macroinvertebrate taxa inhabit the stream. An area in its upper reaches is on the Northumberland County Natural Areas Inventory.

Course

Zerbe Run begins in a valley between two deep and broad ridges (Big Mountain and Little Mountain), in Coal Township. It flows west-southwest for a few tenths of a mile, entering Zerbe Township and the census-designated place of Trevorton. The stream continues flowing west-southwest through Zerbe Township and Trevorton for a few miles, eventually passing through a pond and crossing Pennsylvania Route 890. It then turns west-northwest for a few tenths of a mile, receiving an unnamed tributary from the left before turning west-southwest, crossing Pennsylvania Route 225, which it continues to flow alongside for several miles. After several tenths of a mile, the stream receives another unnamed tributary from the left and continues flowing west-southwest for several tenths of a mile. It then exits Trevorton and Zerbe Township and enters Little Mahanoy Township. Here, the stream turns southwest for more than a mile, receiving two more unnamed tributaries from the left as its valley broadens. It eventually reaches its confluence with Mahanoy Creek.

Tributaries
Zerbe Run has no named tributaries. However, it does have four unnamed tributaries, of which the uppermost is by far the longest.

Hydrology
Some stream reaches in the watershed of Zerbe Run are designated as impaired waterbodies, but others are not. Abandoned mine drainage is the source of impairment of impaired streams in the watershed. The stream's watershed has four abandoned mine drainage sites: the North Franklin Mine drift and Borehole, the North Franklin Mine seepage, the North Franklin Mine bank seepage, and the North Franklin Mine Sunshine Mine overflow. Passive treatment wetlands may be suitable for treating the North Franklin Mine drift and Borehole discharge. There are also large silt piles along the stream near Trevorton. The effect that the abandoned mine drainage discharges have on the water quality of the stream depends on how much unimpacted water is flowing from the stream's upper reaches.

In 2001, Zerbe Run was found to be acidic during low base-flow conditions, but was nearly neutral during high base-flow conditions. In March and August 2001, the net pH of the stream near Trevorton was 7.0 to 7.2, while the net alkalinity  further downstream was 4.3 to 6.0.

The sulfate concentration in March was  near Trevorton and  further downstream, while it was  near Trevorton in August and   further downstream.

In the early 1900s, the channel of Zerbe Run was colored yellow by sulfur pollution. A 1909 report by the Commissioner of Health of the Commonwealth of Pennsylvania stated that "there will be no harm to public health by the discharge of sewage into Zerbe Run at Trevorton".

Geography and geology

The valley of Zerbe Run is situated between Big Mountain on the north and Little Mountain on the south.

During this time period, there were culm banks in the vicinity of the stream at Trevorton. The headwaters of the stream are located in springs east of Trevorton. The upper reaches of the stream's watershed are not impacted by mining. A mine drainage discharge south of Trevorton empties into the stream, causing it to be significantly polluted from Trevorton downstream to its mouth.

Zerbe Run is located just outside the Western Middle Anthracite Field. The dried sediment of the stream near Trevorton is dark brown on the Munsell color system. Further downstream, the sediment is strong brown on the Munsell color system.

Watershed
The mouth of the stream is in the United States Geological Survey quadrangle of Sunbury. However, its source is in the quadrangle of Shamokin. The stream also passes through the quadrangle of Trevorton. The mouth of the stream is located within  of Hunter.

Zerbe Run is one of major streams in the watershed of Mahanoy Creek. Its watershed occupies a total of 8.3% of the Mahanoy Creek drainage basin. Most of the abandoned mine land in the watershed occurs to the south of the stream. A number of swamps/marshes and lakes/ponds occur in the watershed, as does a reservoir.

Areas along Zerbe Run can be significantly impacted by flooding. There are two groundwater withdrawals in the stream's watershed.

History and recreation
Zerbe Run was entered into the Geographic Names Information System on August 2, 1979. Its identifier in the Geographic Names Information System is 1191948. The stream is also known as Zerbe Creek. It was mistakenly referred to as "Zerbe Creek" in a 1965 United States Geological Survey map. Despite this, civil engineer Stephen P Pousardien found in 1969 that all other references referred to the stream as "Zerbe Run", and that locals called the stream "Zerbe Run" as well. The stream was also once known as Little Mahanoy Creek, although there is another tributary of Mahanoy Creek called Little Mahanoy Creek.

There were historically mining operations on Zerbe Run at Trevorton.

Part of Pennsylvania State Game Lands Number 165 is in the northeastern corner of the watershed of Zerbe Run.

Biology
The drainage basin of Zerbe Run is designated as a Coldwater Fishery and a Migratory Fishery. In 2001, macroinvertebrates were observed in the stream at Trevorton and near Dornsife, but no fish were observed. The stream has the potential to be stocked with trout. A lake known as the Zerbe Run Rod And Gun Club Pond is located in the stream's watershed and is stocked with trout.

In 2001, the macroinvertebrate taxa Hydropsychidae and Philopotamidae were "abundant" (25 to 100 individuals) in Zerbe Run at Trevorton. The taxa Leuctridae, Perlidae, Elmidae, and Crydalidae were "common" (10 to 24 individuals). The taxa Cambaridae, Chironomidae (red), Chironomidae (other), and Aeshnidae were "present" (3 to 9 individuals). The taxa Tipulidae, Simuliidae, and Baetidae were "rare" (1 to 2 individuals). Only four macroinvertebrate taxa (Tipulidae, Hydropsychidae, Sialidae, and Gomphidae) were observed in the stream further downstream, and all were "rare".

The family-level Hilsenhoff Biotic Index value of Zerbe Run near Trevorton was observed to be 3.75 in 2001 ("very good"/"excellent"). Further downstream, it was observed to be 4.75 ("good"). Grass-leaved rush, screw stem, and downy lettuce occur along Zerbe Run in Zerbe Township and Coal Township. Eastern hemlock, red maple, yellow birch, cinnamon fern, regal fern, a sedge, goldthread, and mayflower also occur in the area.

A reach of Zerbe Run near its headwaters is listed on the Northumberland County Natural Areas Inventory.

See also
Schwaben Creek, next tributary of Mahanoy Creek going downstream
Crab Run (Mahanoy Creek), next tributary of Mahanoy Creek going upstream
List of rivers of Pennsylvania
List of tributaries of Mahanoy Creek

References

Rivers of Northumberland County, Pennsylvania
Tributaries of Mahanoy Creek
Rivers of Pennsylvania